Indian singer Arijit Singh has received most awards and nominations for the song "Tum Hi Ho" in Aashiqui 2 (2013). He received 9 awards from 10 nominations for this song.

Arijit lent his voice for Pritam-composed 2012 film Barfi! and Vishal–Shekhar-composed Shanghai, where the latter fetched him Mirchi Music Award for Upcoming Male Vocalist of The Year award and was nominated, in the same category for the former.
2013 was the most successful year for Singh where he received numerous praise and awards for his chartbuster song "Tum Hi Ho" in Aashiqui 2. The song fetched him, his first Filmfare, IIFA, Zee Cine and Screen Awards with several other accolades. For the song "Laal Ishq" from Sanjay Leela Bhansali's Goliyon Ki Raasleela Ram-Leela he received a nomination at the GiMA Awards.

In 2014 Singh received 2 nominations in Filmfare Awards for songs "Mast Magan" and "Suno Na Sangemarmar" respectively. He won the GiMA award for the song "Muskurane". He also received several nominations for songs like "Palat", "Humdard" and many more. This year he received his first Filmfare Awards South Nomination in the Telugu Cinema category for the song "Kanulanu Thake" from the movie Manam. He also received nomination in South Indian International Movie Awards for the song "Kanulanu Thake"

2015 was also a successful year for him. This year so many of his songs were chartbusters. In this year he received his second Filmfare Awards for the song "Sooraj Dooba Hain", he was also nominated for the song "Gerua" in the same category. He also received Guild Awards for the song "Hamari Adhuri Kahani". He also won his second Zee Cine Awards for the song "Sooraj Dooba Hain" which he shared along with Mohit Chauhan who won the award for the song "Matargasthi". He has also received Mirchi Music Awards Bangla for the second time for the song "Ke Tui Bol" from the film Herogiri.He also received Best Playback Singer Male Award in the Star Screen Awards and Filmfare Awards 2019 for the song "Ae Watan" from the film Raazi.

He received his first National Film Awards for the song "Binte Dil" from Padmaavat in 2019 for Best Male Playback Singer.

BIG Star Entertainment Awards 
The Big Entertainment Awards are presented annually by Reliance Broadcast Network Limited in association with Star India to honour personalities from the field of entertainment across movies, music, television, sports, theater and dance. Singh has received 7 nominations in the category Most Entertaining Singer Male but never won.

Bollywood Hungama Surfer's Choice Music Awards 
Bollywood Hungama Surfer's Choice Music Awards were presented by Bollywood Hungama to honour the musical work of the artists throughout the year. The winners have been selected based on the number of votes acquired by each of the contenders. These awards have been discontinued after 2015. Singh has received two awards from three nominations in the category Best Male Playback Singer.

Filmfare Awards 
The Filmfare Awards are one of the oldest and most prestigious Hindi film awards. They are presented annually by The Times Group for excellence of cinematic achievements. Singh has won six Best Male Playback Singer awards from eighteen nominations.

Filmfare Awards Bangla 
The Filmfare Awards Bangla (previously Filmfare Awards East) is the Bengali segment of the annual Filmfare Awards, presented by The Times Group to honour both artistic and technical excellence of professionals in the Bengali cinema. Singh has received 2 Best Male Playback Singer award from 10 nominations.

Filmfare Awards South 
The Filmfare Awards South is the South Indian segment of the annual Filmfare Awards, presented by The Times Group to honour both artistic and technical excellence of professionals in the South Indian film industry.

Telugu 
Singh has received one Telugu Best Playback Singer nomination without winning it.

FOI Online Awards 
FOI Online Awards is an annual online poll, researched, organised and voted by a team of film enthusiasts, honouring the artists for their artworks. The poll is held yearly in the month of January–February to judge the best of the Hindi film industry for their masterpieces in the previous year. The jury follows research and successive rounds of voting to elect nominations and winners.

Best Male Playback Singer - Male 
Singh has won four awards from fourteen nominations.

Best Original Song 
(For the category Best Original Song, Composer(s), Lyricist(s) and Singer(s) of the song are credited)

Singh has won one award from ten nominations.

Best Music Direction - Songs

Gaana User's Choice Icons 
Gaana User's Choice Icons was started by Gaana in 2017. The winners are recognized on the basis of tweets on Twitter for each category.

Global Indian Music Academy Awards 
The Global Indian Music Academy Awards are presented annually by Global Indian Music Academy to honour and recognise Indian music artists. Singh has received five awards from twelve nominations.

Best Male Playback Singer 
Singh has won 2 Best Male Playback Singer awards from 7 nominations.

Best Duet 
Singh has won 2 Best Duet awards from 4 nominations.

Best Live Performer

Guild Awards 
The Apsara Film & Television Producers Guild Awards are presented by the Apsara Producers Guild to honour and recognise the professional excellence of their peers. Singh has received two awards from seven nominations. He holds the record of maximum awards and nominations in the Best Male Playback Singer category.

Gujarati Iconic Film Awards 
The Gujarati Iconic Film Awards is a yearly award show which honors talents from Gujarati Film Industry.

International Indian Film Academy Awards 
The International Indian Film Academy Awards are presented annually by the International Indian Film Academy to honour excellence of cinematic achievements in the Hindi language film industry. Singh has received four awards from fifteen nominations. He holds the record of maximum awards and nominations in the Best Male Playback Singer category.

Koimoi Bollywood Audience Poll 
Koimoi Bollywood Audience Poll is an online poll organised by Koimoi.com for the audience to vote. Singh has won six awards from twenty-five nominations in the category Best Male Playback Singer.

Mirchi Music Awards 
The Mirchi Music Awards are presented annually by Radio Mirchi to honour both artistic and technical excellence of professionals in the Hindi language film music industry of India. Singh has received 20 awards and 102 nominations.

Male Vocalist Of The Year
Singh has won 5 awards and 25 nominations in the category Male Vocalist Of The Year.

Song Of The Year
Singh has won 5 awards and 18 nominations in the category Song Of The Year.

Album Of The Year
Singh has won 7 awards and 34 nominations in the category Album Of The Year.

Other awards

Decade awards

Mirchi Music Awards Bangla 
Mirchi Music Awards Bangla is the Bengali segment of the annual Mirchi Music Awards, presented by Radio Mirchi to honour both artistic and technical excellence of professionals in the Bengali language film music industry of India. Singh has received 2 awards from 14 nominations in the category Male Vocalist Of The Year.

Male Vocalist Of The Year

National Film Awards 
The National Film Awards is the most prestigious film award ceremony in India. Established in 1954, it is administered by the International Film Festival of India and the Indian government's Directorate of Film Festivals. The awards are presented by the President of India. Due to their national scale, they are considered to be the equivalent of the American Academy Awards.

RMIM Puraskaar 
The RMIM Puraskaar borrows its name from the news group rec.music.Indian.misc, the oldest community of Hindi film music lovers on the net. These awards voice the opinion of HFM listeners scattered all over the Internet including on forums, groups, blogs, and social networks.
Arijit Singh has won a record eighteen awards from twenty-nine nominations in different categories till date.

Screen Awards 
The Screen Awards honour excellence of cinematic achievements in the Hindi film industry. Singh has received four awards from nine nominations. He holds the record of maximum awards in Best Male Playback Singer category.

South Indian International Movie Awards 
South Indian International Movie Awards, also known as the SIIMA Awards rewards the artistic and technical achievements of the South Indian film industry.

Telugu 
Singh has received one nomination in the category Best Male Playback Singer.

Stardust Awards 
The Stardust Awards is an award ceremony for Hindi movies, which congratulate the superstars of the new generation who are making an impact on the future. It is sponsored by Stardust magazine. Singh has won one award from eight nominations in the category Best Male Playback Singer.

Tele Cine Awards 
Tele Cine Awards are presented annually for the work in the Bengali film and television industry. Singh has one award from five nominations in Best Playback Singer Male category.

Times of India Film Awards 
The Times of India Film Awards are presented by The Times of India to honour both artistic and technical excellence of professionals in the Hindi language film industry of India. Singh has three nominations in the Best Male Playback Singer category.

West Bengal Film Journalists' Association Awards 
The West Bengal Film Journalists' Association Awards (WBFJA Awards) are presented by the West Bengal Film Journalists' Association for the Bengali Film Industry.

Best Male Playback Singer 
Singh has won two Best Male Playback Singer awards and six nominations. He holds the record for the most awards and nominations in this category.

Best Background Score

Zee Cine Awards 
The Zee Cine Awards are presented by Zee Network for the Hindi film industry. The awards were inaugurated in 1998 and include categories decided by public votes and an industry jury. Singh has received five awards from thirteen nominations. He holds the record of maximum awards and nominations in Best Male Playback Singer category.

Other awards

References

External links 

Awards
Lists of awards received by Indian musician